Fort Worth Public Library is the public library system that serves the city of Fort Worth, Texas. The Fort Worth Public Libraries consist of 18 branches including the central library and two regional libraries.

History

In April 1892, 20 women formed the idea for the city's first library while meeting at the home of Jennie Scott Scheuber. Under the Fort Worth Public Library Association, this association received its state charter and with the financial support from Andrew Carnegie they brought the Fort Worth Public Library into existence. Carnegie donated building funds for the construction of more than 2,000 libraries in the United States and from 1886 to 1919 he donated $56 million. Carnegie suggested to the founding women that they ask the local gentlemen for "the price of a good cigar" to help raise the necessary local supporting funds. Sarah Gray Jennings donated the land at 915 Throckmorton Street on stipulation that it always be used for a library. When the City Council approved spending $4,000 per year to run the library, Carnegie contributed $50,000 for the building. The Carnegie Public Library of Fort Worth opened on October 17, 1901, at Ninth and Throckmorton streets.

The PWA Library 
As early as 1926 it was becoming clear that the Carnegie funded building was no longer large enough to handle Fort Worth’s swelling population. The situation became worse during the onset of the Great Depression, when reading rooms became so full that the facility lacked enough chairs or lights at most hours of the day and night. The library board appealed to the Public Works Administration (PWA) in 1933 for funds with $400,000 in subsidies finally arrived in Fort Worth in 1937. A three story, triangular PWA Moderne structure designed by Joseph R. Pelich was built over the spot of the old neoclassical Carnegie library and opened in 1938. Mrs. Scheuber was retired from her role as head librarian and replaced with the professionally trained Harry Peterson, who converted the collection to the Dewey Decimal System and removed the library’s collection of relics to the local children’s museum. In 1967 the building received a Texas Historical Marker in 1967.

In 1978 a new central library building was built at 300 Taylor Street. The old Art Deco building was returned to the ownership of the Sarah Gray Jennings estate in 1980, and although attempts were made to preserve the building as a performing arts center, the old library was razed in 1990 for a parking lot.

Central Library Expansion

Fort Worth's Central Library expansion officially opened October 22, 1999. On March 28, 2000 the Fort Worth Tornado caused over a million dollars in damage to the new Central Library.

Central Library has a spacious Learning Commons for patrons to enjoy a book, magazine, or use a computer. The Central Library also offers its users free Internet access at the computer lab or with WiFi. Computer classes are available to promote information literacy. The Genealogy, Local History and Archives unit is housed within the Central Library; the Archives are also the official municipal archives of the City of Fort Worth.

Regional Libraries
 East Regional – opened
 Southwest Regional – opened

Branches
 Diamond Hill/Jarvis – opened
 East Berry – opened
 Meadowbrook – opened
 Northside – opened
 Ridglea – opened
 Riverside – opened
 Seminary South – opened
 Ella Mae Shamblee – opened
 Summerglen – opened
 Wedgwood – opened
 Northwest – opened
 Golden Triangle – opened
 Reby Cary Youth – opened
 La Gran Biblioteca - opened

Partner library systems

References

External links
 Fort Worth Public Library

Culture of Fort Worth, Texas
Library
Education in Tarrant County, Texas
Public libraries in Texas
Library
David M. Schwarz buildings
Libraries participating in TexShare